The Tanga Coelacanth Marine Park (TCMP) is a Marine park located in Tanga Region, Tanzania. The marine park is around 552 square kilometers, of which 85 square kilometers is terrestrial, covering small coastal parts of Pangani District, Muheza District and Tanga District. The park extends along the coast from 100 km starting from the estuary of the Pangani River to the bay of Tanga City. The Marine parks covers the Islands of Toten, Yambe and Karange Islands. The marine park is home to the famous Coelacanth. The park is also a sanctuary for the African Dugong and Green sea turtle.

References 

Marine parks of Tanzania